Mulabandhasana (Sanskrit: मूलबंधासन) is a sitting asana in hatha yoga.

Etymology

The name is from the Sanskrit मुल mūla, "root, base"; भाण्ड bāndha, "lock"; and आसन āsana, meaning "posture, seat".

Description

The pose is entered from the seated pose Baddha Konasana, in which the soles of the feet are pressed together and the knees rest on the floor. The feet are turned by grasping the toes to point the toes straight downwards, the heels upwards. In a variant, the feet are turned with the toes pointing backwards, when it becomes possible to sit on the outer sides of the feet, the heels remaining pressed together in front of the body. The body is balanced by the arms stretched straight down to the ground behind the back, the shoulder blades pressed together.

Claimed effects

The yoga master B. K. S. Iyengar claimed in his 1966 book Light on Yoga that Mulabandhasana helps to control excessive sexual desire. Mula Bandha, which can be practised also in other asanas, is one of the three principal bandhas, along with Jalandhara Bandha and Uddiyana Bandha (which precede it). He emphasises their importance in pranayama, stating "Without the bandhas, prana is lethal". The Sivananda Yoga centres, describing it as "advanced breathing", claim, as Iyengar does, that retaining the breath, contracting the anal sphincter, and tightening the abdominal muscles in Mula Bandha (hence the name bandha or lock) prevents the escape of apana, enabling it to rise up the body to join with prana. 

In Ashtanga Vinyasa Yoga, Mulabandhasana is in the fourth series of asanas; it is claimed to activate the root chakra, the muladhara.

Origin

The central figure in the Pashupati seal from the Indus Valley civilization of c. 2500 BC appears to be sitting in Mulabandhasana, and hence identified as a prototype of the god Śiva. If correct, this would be easily the oldest record of an asana. However, with no proof anywhere of an Indus Valley origin for Śiva, there is no evidence that a yoga pose is depicted in the seal.

See also 
 Kundalini energy
 Kapalbhati Pranayama
 Gorakshasana
 Uddiyana bandha

References

Sources

Further reading

 
 

Sitting asanas
Mudras